Deen Kemsley is an accounting professor and a Christian author.  He earned a PhD in business and economics from the University of North Carolina at Chapel Hill in 1995.  He then served on the faculty at Columbia Business School from 1995 to 2004, taking a one-year visit to Yale School of Management in 2003.  He now teaches at the A.B. Freeman School of Business at Tulane University.  In addition to his academic work, Professor Kemsley is the author of Trust in the Lord: Reflections of Jesus Christ (Sweetwater Books).

MBA students, stock analysts, and bond analysts all know Professor Kemsley for his teaching abilities.  He earned the Dean's Teaching Award at Columbia Business School in 1998, Columbia University's Singhvi Teaching Award for Scholarship in the Classroom in 1999, and numerous Teacher Honor Roll awards at Tulane University.  On Wall Street, he regularly trains analysts for Morgan Stanley, Lehman Brothers, and other banks.

Business professors know Professor Kemsley for his published research on taxes, accounting, and firm value.  He has published several articles in top finance and accounting journals, including the Journal of Finance, the Journal of Accounting Research, and the Accounting Review, among others.

His joint work on taxes, dividends, and debt with Glenn Hubbard (economics), Trevor Harris, and Doron Nissim stirred considerable controversy and has been considered by Congress on several occasions.

Professor Kemsley also is an author who writes for a broad Christian audience regardless of creed or denomination.  Several prominent theologians, scholars, business leaders, and media personalities from a variety of different backgrounds and beliefs have endorsed Trust in the Lord: Reflections of Jesus Christ.

Deen and his wife Kristin are the parents of nine children.  They live in Abita Springs, Louisiana.

Books

Deen Kemsley is the author of Trust in the Lord: Reflections of Jesus Christ. Many prominent business leaders and others have endorsed his book. The following review came from Publishers Weekly:

Kemsley, an accounting professor at Tulane University in New Orleans, posits that “the journey to know Christ is the journey to know the deepest, best element of ourselves.” In this brief book, Kemsley draws on personal experiences and anecdotes to demonstrate how he came to know Christ. His experiences are not miraculous or earth-shattering, but ordinary and real: seeing Christ reflected in a newborn, for example, or an act of service. As a father of nine children, many of these acts of service are unseen and unthanked late-night feedings or diaper changes; though they did not seem significant at the time, Kemsley now realizes that such simple deeds mean everything. Although Kemsley is a Mormon and the book is from an LDS publisher, it has a deeply ecumenical tone. The focus throughout is on knowing and loving Christ, not emphasizing denominational differences. Although it lacks the poetic nature of some other memoirish devotional books of this type, such as The Quantity of a Hazelnut, there is a simple honesty to this volume that makes it refreshing and quietly lovely. (Mar.)

External links
 http://www.deenkemsley.com
 https://web.archive.org/web/20071230015216/http://www.freeman.tulane.edu/faculty/accounting.htm

References

Living people
University of North Carolina at Chapel Hill alumni
Latter Day Saints from North Carolina
Freeman School of Business faculty
Tulane University faculty
Accounting academics
People from Abita Springs, Louisiana
Latter Day Saints from New York (state)
Latter Day Saints from Louisiana
Year of birth missing (living people)